Leon Wilbur Chagnon (September 28, 1902 – July 30, 1953) was a professional baseball pitcher. He played all or part of six seasons in Major League Baseball, between 1929 and 1935, for the Pittsburgh Pirates and New York Giants.

Chagon died on July 30, 1935, and was buried in Mount Prospect Cemetery in Amesbury, Massachusetts.

References

External links

Major League Baseball pitchers
Pittsburgh Pirates players
New York Giants (NL) players
Lynn Papooses players
Columbia Comers players
Wichita Aviators players
Fort Worth Panthers players
Mission Reds players
Montreal Royals players
Wilkes-Barre Barons (baseball) players
Nashville Vols players
Baltimore Orioles (IL) players
Baseball players from New Hampshire
1902 births
1953 deaths
People from Pittsfield, New Hampshire